Kulhavý (Czech feminine: Kulhavá) is a Czech surname meaning literally "a limping person". Notable people include:

 Bedřiška Kulhavá (born 1931), Czech middle-distance runner
 Jana Kulhavá (born 1964), Czech biathlete
 Jaroslav Kulhavý (born 1985), Czech mountain biker

See also
 
 

Czech-language surnames